The FIBA Saporta Cup Finals was the championship finals series of the now defunct FIBA Saporta Cup competition. FIBA Saporta Cup was the name of the European-wide second-tier level professional club basketball competition. It was the competition in which the domestic National Cup winners from all over Europe played against each other. The competition was organized by FIBA Europe. It was named after the late Raimundo Saporta, a former Real Madrid director.

Title holders

 1966–67  Ignis Varese
 1967–68  AEK
 1968–69  Slavia VŠ Praha
 1969–70  Fides Napoli
 1970–71  Simmenthal Milano
 1971–72  Simmenthal Milano
 1972–73  Spartak Leningrad
 1973–74  Crvena zvezda
 1974–75  Spartak Leningrad
 1975–76  Cinzano Milano
 1976–77  Birra Forst Cantù
 1977–78  Gabetti Cantù
 1978–79  Gabetti Cantù
 1979–80  Emerson Varese
 1980–81  Squibb Cantù
 1981–82  Cibona
 1982–83  Scavolini Pesaro
 1983–84  Real Madrid
 1984–85  FC Barcelona
 1985–86  FC Barcelona
 1986–87  Cibona
 1987–88  Limoges CSP
 1988–89  Real Madrid
 1989–90  Knorr Bologna
 1990–91  PAOK
 1991–92  Real Madrid Asegurator
 1992–93  Sato Aris
 1993–94  Smelt Olimpija 
 1994–95  Benetton Treviso
 1995–96  Taugrés
 1996–97  Real Madrid Teka
 1997–98  Žalgiris
 1998–99  Benetton Treviso
 1999–00  AEK
 2000–01  Maroussi
 2001–02  Montepaschi Siena

Finals
For finals not played on a single match, * precedes the score of the team playing at home.

Titles by club

Titles by nation

FIBA Saporta Cup Finals Records

FIBA Saporta Cup Finals Awards

See also
FIBA Saporta Cup
FIBA Saporta Cup Finals MVP
FIBA Saporta Cup Finals Top Scorer
FIBA Saporta Cup Top Scorer
FIBA Saporta Cup Records
FIBA Festivals
FIBA EuroStars

External links
FIBA Saporta Cup @ FIBA Europe.com
FIBA Saporta Cup Winners 
FIBA Saporta Cup @ LinguaSport.com

Finals
Basketball games in Europe